Forest is both a French surname and a given name. Notable people with the name include:

Surname:
Antonia Forest (1915–2003), pseudonym of Patricia Giulia Caulfield Kate Rubinstein, English writer of children's novels
Autumn de Forest (born 2001), American painter from Las Vegas, Nevada
Carmen Forest (born 1955), American former handball player who competed in the 1984 Summer Olympics
Delphine Forest (1966–2020), French actress
Denis Forest (1960–2002), Canadian character actor
Earl Forest (1926–2003), American musician
Emmelie de Forest (born 1993), Danish singer and songwriter
Erastus L. De Forest (1834–1888), American mathematician
Éric Forest (born 1952), Canadian Senator from Quebec
Frank Forest (1896–1976), American opera singer
Fred Forest (born 1933), French new media artist 
George Beach de Forest Jr. (1848–1932), American capitalist, bibliophile and art collector 
Gérard La Forest (born 1926), former puisne justice of the Supreme Court of Canada
Green Forest (1979–2000), American-bred French-trained Thoroughbred racehorse and sire
Henry S. De Forest (1847–1917), U.S. Representative from New York
Jacques Forest (1920–2012), French carcinologist
James J.F. Forest, author and a professor at the University of Massachusetts Lowell
Jean Forest, OC (born 1926), Canadian retired Senator
Jean-Baptiste Forest (1636–1712), French landscape painter
Jean-Claude Forest (1930–1998), French comic book author, creator of Barbarella
Jean-Marie Forest (1752–1794) Modena was a general of the French Revolution
Jean Kurt Forest (1909–1975), German violinist and violist, Kapellmeister and composer
Jessé de Forest (1576–1624), leader of a group of Walloon Huguenots fleeing religious persecution
Jim Forest (1941–2022), American writer, lay theologian, educator, peace activist
Joanna Forest, opera crossover soprano singer
John Anthony Forest (1838–1911), French-born clergyman of the Roman Catholic Church
John de Forest (1907–1997), English amateur golfer
John Forest (1471–1538), English Roman Catholic martyr and friar
John William De Forest (1826–1906), American soldier and writer
Karl Forest (1874–1944), Austrian actor
Lee De Forest (1873–1961), American inventor with over 180 patents to his credit
Léonard Forest (born 1928), Acadian filmmaker, poet and essayist
Lockwood de Forest (1850–1932), American painter, interior designer and furniture designer
Ludger Forest (L'Assomption MLA) (1826–1903), physician and political figure in Quebec
Ludger Forest (Sherbrooke MLA) (1877–1943), dentist and political figure in Quebec
Luigi De La Forest (1668–1738), Italian-French painter, who was active in Modena
Marian de Forest (1864–1935), American journalist, playwright, founder of Zonta
Mark Forest (1933–2022), American actor and bodybuilder
Maurice de Forest (1879–1968), early motor racing driver, aviator and Liberal politician in the UK
Michael Forest (born 1929), American actor who provides the voices for many animated titles
Mickaël Forest (born 1975), French rugby union footballer
Patsy De Forest (1894–1966), American actress of the silent cinema era who performed on the stage since childhood
Philippe Forest (born 1962), French author and professor of literature
Robert E. De Forest (1845–1924), Democratic member of the United States House of Representatives from Connecticut
Robert Forest (cyclist) (born 1961), former French professional cyclist
Roy De Forest (1930–2007), American painter
Viviane Forest (born 1979), Canadian multi-sport Paralympic medallist
Yves Forest, QC (1921–2019), Liberal party member of the House of Commons of Canada

Given name:
Forest Able (born 1932), retired American basketball player
Frederic de Forest Allen (1844–1897), American classical scholar
Forest B. H. Brown (1873–1954), American botanist working on pteridophytes and spermatophytes
Forest Barber (born 1952), American racing driver from Fort Worth, Texas
Forest Baskett, American venture capitalist, computer scientist, professor of electrical engineering at Stanford University
Bernard Forest de Bélidor (1698–1761), French engineer in hydraulics and ballistics
Emmett Forest Branch (1874–1932), the 31st Governor of the U.S. state of Indiana
George de Forest Brush (1855–1941), American painter and Georgist
William Forest Crouch (1904–1968), American director and writer of film
Forest Davis (1879–1958), American politician from the state of Iowa
Forest Dewey Dodrill (1902–1997), doctor who performed the first successful open heart surgery
Forest Etheredge (1929–2004), American educator and politician
Forest Evashevski (1918–2009), American football player, coach, college athletics administrator
Forest K. Ferguson (1919–1954), athlete and later a decorated officer in the U.S. Army
Forest Firestone (1876–1940), American football player and coach
Forest Fletcher (1888–1945), US track and field Olympic athlete, coach, athletic director
Forest Flower (horse) (1984–2011), American-bred, British-trained Thoroughbred racehorse and broodmare
Forest Geyer (1892–1932), American football fullback
Forest Harness (1895–1974), U.S. Representative from Indiana
Forest Hays Jr. (born 1928), American politician in the state of Georgia
Forest Hopkins (1912–1978), former Republican member of the Pennsylvania House of Representatives
Forest City Joe (1926–1960), American blues musician mainly remembered as a harmonica player
Forest Lothrop (born 1924), former American football coach
Forest Loudin (1890–1935), American football, basketball, and baseball coach
Forest McNeir (1875–1957), American sport shooter who competed in the 1920 Summer Olympics
Forest Montgomery (1874–1947), American tennis player
Forest Ray Moulton (1872–1952), American astronomer
J. De Forest Richards (1874–1949), American football player and banker
Forest Rohwer (born 1969), American microbial ecologist, Professor of Biology at San Diego State University
Forest Sale (1911–1985), American college basketball player at the University of Kentucky
Forest Sun (born 1973), Americana singer-songwriter from San Francisco, California, United States
Forest Vance (born 1981), personal trainer and former American football player
Forest Whitaker (born 1961), American actor, producer and director

Fictional characters:
 Forest Law (Tekken), a playable character in Namco Bandai's Tekken fighting game franchise

See also
 Forrest (given name)
 Forrest (surname)
 Patrik "f0rest" Lindberg (born 1998), Swedish Counter-Strike and Counter-Strike: Global Offensive player
 DeForest (name)
 Dominic "Forest" Lapointe, bassist of Augury, formerly of Beyond Creation

French-language surnames